Hollins High School, formerly known as Dixie M. Hollins High School, is a public secondary school located in St. Petersburg, Florida, United States. The school was opened in 1959 as a vocational school for grades 10–12, but it has since expanded to include 9th grade education. The school has just under 1,800 students.

Its graphic arts program, known as the Academy of Entertainment Arts (AEA), is designated as a center of excellence. The school also offers a program in the culinary arts, which is also designated as a center of excellence. The school also offers Cambridge/AICE curriculum, as well as a Junior Reserve Officers' Training Corps (JROTC) program.

History
When Pinellas County separated from Hillsborough County and became its own entity in 1912, Dixie Martin Hollins was appointed as Superintendent of Pinellas County Schools; he was about twenty-five years old. Hollins was considered progressive for his time, said the school's principal in 2020, Robert Florio, citing his advocacy of equality in education and hiring of graduates from historically black colleges and universities. Hollins promoted the rights of black students to have certified teachers, to attend a full school day, and to attend school for more than just a few months per year. When Hollins High School opened its doors for the first time in the fall of 1959, it was named Northwest High School. Almost immediately the School Board decided to name the new high school after Dixie Hollins. His family owned and operated one of the largest ranches in the state in Citrus County from 1942 until 1992 when all but a small portion was sold upon the death of his son, Maurice L. Hollins. Dixie Hollins donated land for both Madeira Beach Elementary and Middle Schools. His estate continues to provide contributions to Dixie's music program.

In 1971, the school became national news when the campus became embroiled in a community protest against racial integration through forced busing. The unrest had been building for several weeks. When the school decided to ban the use of the Confederate flag, community groups began picketing the school. The unrest broke out into violence on October 12, 1971. When Florida schools mandated kindergarten, Dixie Hollins High School incorporated 9th grade into its curriculum. The school underwent extensive renovations in 1992–1996, adding a two-story science wing, a new media center and cafeteria, an art building, a music building, and upgrading the existing classrooms, the gymnasium, and the vocational wing.

In 2020, a student group created a petition on Change.org that called for the school's name and mascot to be changed, citing the relationship between the term "Dixie" and the Confederate States, as well as the mascot's resemblance to a Confederate soldier. Following the petition, the school's name was changed from Dixie Hollins High School to Hollins High School, and the "Rebels" moniker used for the school's athletic teams was changed to "Royals".

Notable alumni 

 Kurt Abbott, baseball player
 Marquel Blackwell, football player
 Erroll M. Brown, first African-American admiral, United States Coast Guard
 Michele Elliott, author, psychologist and founder of child protection charity Kidscape
 Andre Hall, football player
 Dametri Hill, basketball player
 Nate Johnson, football player
 Gary Keller, basketball player
 Bill Kirchenbauer, actor, comedian, producer
 Jim Leavitt, football player, college and professional football coach
 Jesse Litsch (born March 9, 1985) is an American former professional baseball pitcher.
 DeAndrew Rubin, football player
 Roy Smith (born May 18, 1976) is an American former professional baseball pitcher.
 Buzz Sawyer, professional wrestler 
 Korey Veeder, soccer player
 Fred Williams, football player

References

External links

High schools in Pinellas County, Florida
Public high schools in Florida